Newburg is an unincorporated community in Fillmore County, in the U.S. state of Minnesota.

History
Newburg was platted in 1853. A post office was established at Newburg in 1855, and remained in operation until it was discontinued in 1902.

References

Unincorporated communities in Fillmore County, Minnesota
Unincorporated communities in Minnesota